

Arno Jahr (3 December 1890 – 21 January 1943) was a general in the Wehrmacht of Nazi Germany during World War II. He was a recipient of the Knight's Cross of the Iron Cross. 

He was an officer in World War I. After 1918 he was a police officer. In 1935 he was transferred to the Wehrmacht In 1937 he was promoted to colonel.

Jahr committed suicide on 21 January 1943 when his unit was being overrun as part of the encirclement during the Battle of Stalingrad.

Awards and decorations 

 Knight's Cross of the Iron Cross on 22 December 1942 as Generalleutnant and commander of 387. Infanterie-Division

Notes

References 

 

1890 births
1943 suicides
People from Teuchern
People from the Province of Saxony
Lieutenant generals of the German Army (Wehrmacht)
German Army personnel of World War I
Recipients of the clasp to the Iron Cross, 1st class
Recipients of the Knight's Cross of the Iron Cross
German military personnel who committed suicide
Suicides by firearm in the Soviet Union
German police officers
Military personnel from Saxony-Anhalt
German Army generals of World War II